Route 72 is a highway in southern Missouri.  Its eastern terminus is at Route 34 west of Jackson; its western terminus is at I-44 in Rolla.

Route 72 is one of the original 1922 state highways. Its eastern terminus was at Centerville, and its western terminus was at the junction with Route 32. The part between Arcadia and Fredericktown was Route 70 from 1922 to 1959, when it became part of Route 72 because of I-70.

Route 72 was rebuilt a few years back from Elk Prairie, just south of Rolla;  to the intersection of Hwy 32, west of Salem.  The road was widened and shoulders were built.

As Route 72 passes through Salem, it crosses Route 19; then runs concurrently eastward for 10 miles with Route 32.  It then splits off to the southeast towards the small town of Bunker.  It is very curvy; it passes back and forth between Dent and Reynolds county several times.  After passing through Bunker, it runs mostly eastward for 17 miles; before intersecting Hwy 21; 3 miles south of Centerville.  72 then turns left (north) and runs concurrently with Hwy 21 through Centerville.  Between Centerville and Lesterville, Route 49 joins it and 21, 72 and 49 run concurrently eastward to the Glover corner.  Route 49 turns right (south) at that corner; while Route 72 and 21 turn left (north).  Route 72 and Route 21 run north for 10 miles to Arcadia; at the south edge of Ironton; Route 21 continues north while Route 72 turns east.  However, it has a unique interchange; it crosses under Hwy 72 east on 21/72, then turns left (west)for one block, then turns left(southeast) and goes back up over 21/72.  Route 72 then runs east, intersects US Hwy 67 west of Fredericktown.  It then proceeds to its eastern terminus with Route 34 at Jackson, MO.

Route description

History

Major intersections

References

External links 

072
Transportation in Phelps County, Missouri
Transportation in Dent County, Missouri
Transportation in Reynolds County, Missouri
Transportation in Iron County, Missouri
Transportation in Madison County, Missouri
Transportation in Bollinger County, Missouri
Transportation in Cape Girardeau County, Missouri